Luo Xiangang (born December 1970) is a Chinese engineer specializing in photoelectric technology. He is an academician of the Chinese Academy of Engineering currently serves as director of the Institute of Optics and Electronics, Chinese Academy of Sciences.

Biography
Luo was born in Cangxi County, Sichuan, in December 1970. He attended Qinglin Village School. He elementary studied at Baiqiao Town Middle School and secondary studied at Chengjiao High School. In 1989 he graduated from Mianyang Teachers' College. He holds a bachelor's degree from Sichuan Normal University, and master's and doctor's degrees from the Institute of Optics and Electronics, Chinese Academy of Sciences. He was a postdoctoral fellow at the Institute of Physical and Chemical Research between May 2001 and May 2002. He was also a research scientist at the institute from May 2001 to January 2005. He joined the Institute of Optics and Electronics, Chinese Academy of Sciences in December 2004.

Honours and awards
 2008 National Science Fund for Distinguished Young Scholars
 2014 Fellow of the International Academy of Photonics and Laser Engineering (IAPLE) 
 2016 State Technological Invention Award (First Class)
 2018 Fellow of the Chinese Optical Society (COS)
 2019 Fellow of The Optical Society (OSA)
 2019 Fellow of SPIE
 November 22, 2019 Member of the Chinese Academy of Engineering (CAE)

References

External links
Luo Xiangang on the Institute of Optics and Electronics, Chinese Academy of Sciences  

1970 births
Living people
People from Cangxi County
Engineers from Sichuan
Sichuan Normal University alumni
Members of the Chinese Academy of Engineering
Fellows of Optica (society)
Fellows of SPIE